Pireneitega segestriformis is an araneomorph spider species found in Europe and Russia.

References

External links 

Agelenidae
Spiders of Europe
Spiders of Russia
Spiders described in 1820